Golda Lee Marcus (born March 15, 1983 in Nahuizalco, El Salvador) is a two-time Olympic swimmer from El Salvador. She swam at the 2004 and 2008 Olympics. As of June 2009, she holds the Salvadoran records in the 400, 800, and 1500 meter freestyles.

In 2001, she won 7 gold and 2 silver medals at the 2001 Central American Games, and 2 golds and 3 bronzes at the CCCAN Championships. At the 2002 Central American and Caribbean Games, she garnered bronze medals in the 200m, 400m and 800m freestyles.

At the 2006 Central American and Caribbean Games, she won bronze medals in the women's 1500m Free and as part of the 4x200 Freestyle Relay.

At the 2007 CCCANs, she won the 200, 400, and 800 meter freestyles, and finished second in the 200 meter butterfly.

She also swam for El Salvador at the 2003 and 2007 World Championships, and at the 2007 Pan American Games.

She has previously coached De Anza Cupertino Aquatics, and as of 2020, she is currently coaching Burlingame Aquatics Club (BAC) in California. She teaches at Saratoga High School with competitive swimmers.

References

1983 births
Living people
Swimmers at the 2004 Summer Olympics
Swimmers at the 2008 Summer Olympics
Olympic swimmers of El Salvador
Swimmers at the 2007 Pan American Games
Salvadoran female swimmers
Pan American Games competitors for El Salvador
Florida State Seminoles women's swimmers
Salvadoran female freestyle swimmers
Central American and Caribbean Games bronze medalists for El Salvador
Competitors at the 2002 Central American and Caribbean Games
Competitors at the 2006 Central American and Caribbean Games
Central American and Caribbean Games medalists in swimming